The Battle of Gemmano took place during World War II, between the dates of September 4th, and September 15th of 1944. The battle occurred in the area of the Gothic Line, near the Apennine Mountains in northern Italy, which would soon turn out to be the last line of defense for the Axis Powers in Italy. The village of Gemmano was eventually captured on September 9th, 1944 by the invading Eighth Army (United Kingdom), but two more subsequent attacks were needed to secure the area surrounding the village of Gemmano. Fighting was so fierce, similar to that of the famous battle of Monte Cassino, that the battle was sometimes referred to as, “ The Cassino of the Adriatic”.

Order of battle

Events

Tactics and strategy
Under Operation Olive, the objective for the British Eighth Army on the Adriatic Coast was to break the German defenses and enter the Po Plains. The US Fifth Army would then follow up with an attack north of Florence, completing the German defeat.
The first assault, as well as the following ten, would prove to be futile for the Allies. The final assault brought on by the 4th Indian Infantry Division, after heavy bombardment, would prove to be successful in the capture and securement of all German positions in Gemmano.

Initial reconnaissance of Gemmano
Two days before the first attack on September 4, a British Battalion sent a platoon of 30 men to determine the size and strength of the German defenses. The British made an unfortunate mistake, underestimating the size of the German forces as only one battalion.
The actual size of the German force was approximately three battalions or 4,500 men of the 100th Gebirgsjager that were overlooking the allied positions. The  Allies left only one battalion to fight the battle at Gemmano because of their wrong estimation of the German forces.
These  German battalions consisted of antiaircraft weaponry as well, which could also be used as artillery on the advancing allied infantry and armored vehicles.

General conditions
As the numerous attacks on the village of Gemmano took place, heavy rainfall hindered the advance of Allies as well. This heavy rainfall caused roads to crumble, rivers to overflow, and mud to form, all of which made it difficult for movement and transportation. Slopes of mountains became slick and slippery and allowed for weapon malfunctions to occur.

Below are personal memoirs, testimony, and description of the battle by soldiers who were involved.

"All around the bullet-chipped cross on Pt.449, the dead, khaki and field-grey, lay heaped, unburied, in score upon score; at their center a soldier of the Lincolns whose hands were still frozen in death round the cross itself, which he had reached in his battalion's first attack. Few regiments of 8th Army had ever known fiercer fighting than that of Gemmano"

"Within twenty-four hours the only men left in the village of Gemmano... were the men who would never leave".

"They sat, wedged side by side, in the ruined cellars of the old stone houses; sprawled in piles on the doorways of barns; lay in untidy heaps in the little peasants' houses where they had crawled to die".

Holworthy (CO 4th Indian Div.) wrote in his diary :
"A good show. Gemmano full of dead and smells like another Cassino"

Aftermath

Casualties
Casualties from both sides are not well documented, but according to British sources, Germans killed in action were more than 900. Lt.Col.Ernst also estimated more than 2,400 casualties of dead, wounded, and MIA of his regiment alone. British casualties were immense too: every battalion lost, on average, 100 to 150 men. More than 100 civilians were also killed during the battle, mainly due to the Royal Navy and its bombardment of Gemmano.

Medals and awards
The German 100th Mountain Regiment, or Gebirgsjager, under the orders from Lt. Col. Richard Ernst, earned the regiment 6 Ritterkreuz des Eisernes Kreuz for valor demonstrated during the battle of Gemmano as well as acts of bravery in combat far beyond the normal fulfillment of duty.

Ritterkruez awards were given to:

Lt. Col. Richard Ernst

Capt. Heinrich Hermann

Capt. Fritz Bachmaier

Ensign August Rappel

Corp. Lorenz Schmied

Lt. Karl Kurz

References

Bibliography and external links
 Gerhard Muhm : German Tactics in the Italian Campaign
 Gerhard Muhm : La Tattica tedesca nella Campagna d'Italia, in Linea Gotica avanposto dei Balcani, (Hrsg.) Amedeo Montemaggi - Edizioni Civitas, Roma 1993

Gemmano
1944 in Italy
September 1944 events
Gemmano
Gemmano
Gemmano